Stafford Railway Building Society is a UK building society, which has its headquarters in Stafford, Staffordshire. It was formed in 1877 by a small group of railway workers of the London & North Western Railway Company. It is a member of the Building Societies Association.

It current offers mortgages and other financial products to its members.

References

External links
 

Building societies of England
Banks established in 1877
Organizations established in 1877
Companies based in Stafford
Organisations based in Staffordshire
1877 establishments in England